The Environment Act 1986 of New Zealand established the Ministry for the Environment and the Office of the Parliamentary Commissioner for the Environment.

References
 About the Environment Act 1986.
 Text of Act

Statutes of New Zealand
Urban planning in New Zealand
Environmental law in New Zealand
1986 in New Zealand law
1986 in the environment